= Kim Eon Hee =

South Korean poet (born 1953)

Kim Eon Hee (born 1953) is a South Korean poet. Born in Jinju, South Gyeongsang Province, she graduated from the College of Education at Gyeongsang National University. She made her literary debut in 1989 by publishing ten poems, including "The Silent Country" (Goyohan Nara), in Contemporary Poetics (Hyundae Sihak).

By constructing a bizarre and original poetic world, she has been dubbed the "Medusa of the Korean poetry scene" by critics and the media. Kim is regarded as a prominent figure in postmodern and avant-garde Korean poetry, known for her unconventional language and grotesque bodily imagery. Her depictions of the body initially provoked debate over their feminist implications, but since the 2000s bodily fragmentation and the transgression of taboos in her poetry have gained recognition as subversive aesthetic strategies.

Kim has published a total of seven poetry collections, from her debut collection Trunk (1995) to her most recent work Horangmalko (2024). She has received numerous awards, including the Oh Jang-hwan Literary Award, the Cheongma Literary Award, the Yi Sang Poetry Award, the Park In-hwan Literary Award, and the Poetry and Thought Literary Award.

== Life ==
Since her literary debut in 1989, Kim has continued to live and write in Jinju, a small city far from Seoul. In her early fifties, she left her teaching career in order to devote herself exclusively to writing poetry. She served as president of the Hyeongpyeong Literature Promotion Association (Note: The Hyeongpyeong Literature Promotion Association organizes the annual Hyeongpyeong Literary Festival in Jinju to carry on the spirit of the Hyeongpyeong Movement, regarded as Korea’s first human rights movement. The festival presents awards to writers who have contributed to the development of regional literature.) from 2016 to 2019. She is known for rarely disclosing her public activities or personal life beyond her literary work. Writing about a visit to South Korea in 2024, writer Johanna Hedva recalled that she had searched everywhere for Kim Eon Hee but had been unable to meet her. She added, "The few who'd read her spoke of her work as if it were a best-kept secret in Korea."

Critic Yang Hyo-shil interpreted the poet’s reclusiveness and geographical marginality as extending beyond mere physical distance to function as a literary stance of resistance to the mainstream order, writing as follows:

"Poet Kim Eon Hee writes poetry from Jinju, far from Seoul—or, as she puts it, from the position of a beast, far removed from humans. The poet attacks the humans of Seoul with an absolute distance—a difference in category, not merely in degree. From a rough, filthy place where lawless violence runs rampant, she seeks to disrupt and subvert the refined and beautiful realm within the city gates ruled by the father-law. It is a place where bad names and profanity are the language of life, and a realm of wildness and savagery not yet fully colonized."

== Poetic world ==
Kim Eon Hee's poetry frequently features explicit slang, sexual expressions, and imagery of taboo and blasphemy. As a result, her work has been classified as "difficult poetry", "deconstructive poetry", or "poetry of cruelty". The poet has stated that she uses provocative language to awaken readers' senses and broaden the scope of their thinking, and that by exposing the ugliness of the world she seeks to confront its claims to absoluteness and sacredness. Critic Ryu Shin has described her poetry as "the scene of an event where the negative sublime (Note: The 'experience of the negative sublime' is defined as "a Dionysian intoxication advancing toward the paralysis of reason and the liberation of the senses, an ecstatic experience in which the pain of destruction and the joy of becoming alternate, fear and trembling before the infinite that lies beyond the horizon of rational human cognition, and an experience of absolute freedom beyond good and evil, truth and falsehood, and beauty and ugliness" (Ryu Shin, "On Kim Eon Hee: The Erect Sublime", Poetry and World, (44), p. 126).) occurs."

=== Excess of the body ===
Several critics have focused on the excessive corporeality of Kim's poetry, reading its emphasis on the material body as a challenge to idealized conceptions of humanity and the world.

This leather trunk

So tough, so bloated, so heavy

Unzip it and it
Gapes open, its entire body a maw

— Kim Eon Hee, "Trunk", Trunk (1995), trans. Soje, excerpt.

The poet has stated that humans are grounded in the solid material basis of the mouth, anus, and genitalia, and that ontological significance is merely a fiction constructed through self-deception. In her poetry, humans are depicted as objects such as a bloated leather trunk ("Trunk"), meat inside a cold-storage warehouse ("At birth") (Note: e.g., ". . . At birth I found/Myself inside a fridge//I was told I was birthed by some buttocks/Hung on a hook but no one/Knew whose buttocks/They were [...]". Original Korean: "……태어나보니/냉장고 속이었어요//갈고리에 매달린 엉덩짝이 나를/낳았다는데 무엇의/엉덩짝인지/아무도 모르더군요" ("태어나보니" ["At birth"], 트렁크 [Trunk], Munhakdongne, 2020 reissue, p. 56; first published in 1995)), or the Creator's excrement ("Horangmalko") (Note: e.g., "We can’t possibly be the creations of a Divine Creator. Excrement, maybe. Unless he shat us out to mark his territory in this desolate universe. [...]". Original Korean: "우리가 조물주의 창조물일 리가 없다. 배설물이라면 모를까. 우리를 배설해서 이 황막한 우주에 영역 표시를 해 둔 거라면 모를까." ("호랑말코" ["Horangmalko"], 호랑말코 [Horangmalko], Moonji Publishing, 2024, p. 74)). Critics such as Choi Jin-seok and Ryu Shin have compared Kim Eon Hee's poetics—which foreground the materiality and abjection of the body to strip away the symbolic meanings imposed upon human beings and dismantle illusions about humanity—to a "slaughterhouse".

The speaker in her poems is typically portrayed as a female body described in terms of orifices—the mouth, anus, and vulva; as a hybrid whose bodily parts shift and intermingle, dissolving boundaries; and as an entity that actively yearns for dissolution and death. Choi Jin-seok argued that the excessive invocation of feminine sexuality functions as a subversive mechanism that destroys patriarchal hierarchies and reveals the human as a fiction. Baek Ji-yeon read the female speaker in the poetry as refusing to be objectified, deconstructing masculinity through mirroring (Note: A rhetorical strategy in feminist discourse used to confront misogyny by turning men's own logic back on them, thereby exposing the violent logic of exclusion they employ (Baek Ji-yeon, p. 86).), and revealing the violence of the civilized world through the self-destruction and dissolution of the body. On the other hand, Yang Hyo-shil interpreted the poetic speaker as a supra-feminine subject resisting the social norms of masculinity and femininity, and as a third kind of being who is "neither woman nor man, neither human nor beast".

On the other hand, this body has also been interpreted as a "mechanical body." Poet Lee Seung-hoon and critic Jang Cheol-hwan argued that the body in Kim's poetry is a "desiring-machine", and that the aimlessly overflowing sexual acts of this desiring machine underscore the meaninglessness of life. Similarly, poet Lee Soo-myung interpreted it as an "automatic body" freed from the domination of the mind—an "objectless, self-propelled body, a purely material body lacking the mechanism of reflection". In this reading, human beings, as an automatic body, descend to a status no superior to artificial or natural objects. Lee also argued that presenting unreflective bodily acts like exhibition objects, thereby producing discomfort in the reader, serves to challenge established aesthetic conventions of concealment.

Explaining why she foregrounds such reified and damaged bodies, the poet has stated that the world is composed of bodies and that "a damaged body is none other than a damaged world". By revealing the unpleasant materiality of existence through the body as the locus of sensory experience, she seeks to confront readers with the brutal reality of the world. Contemporary artist Mire Lee, who has collaborated with Kim, wrote: “Her poetry carries away with its bare hands and teeth things that others would seal in a hazmat bag and handle with protective gear. Even when the poems seem to be at their most scornful, demeaning, and cruel, they are always bare, skin to skin with their subjects.”

=== Sex and death ===
Critics have interpreted Kim's recurring motifs of sex and death in different ways. Shin Hyeong-cheol, for example, describes Kim's dismantling of the patriarchal symbolic order and established conventions through sexual motifs as the "substitution and subversion" of sexual relations. According to him, since birth and death are beyond human control, only sex—the attempt to unite with the Other—remains as an actual act within human control. On this premise, Shin observes that Kim's poetry adopts a dual strategy: it first replaces the sexual relationship between men and women with a father-daughter relationship—symbolizing a dominant-subordinate dynamic between the subject and the Other—and then reappropriates violent masculine predicates (Note: e.g., "Father, I’ll tear your hymen for you […] Father, I’ll make you die again and again". Original Korean: "아버지의 처녀막을 찢어드릴게 […] 아버지 아주 죽여드릴게 몇 번이고" ("가족극장, 이리 와요 아버지" ["Family Theater, Come Here Father"], 말라죽은 앵두나무 아래 잠자는 저 여자 [That Woman Sleeping Under the Withered Cherry Tree ], Minumsa, 2000, p. 89)) by directing them back at the authoritative subject ("the father"). He argues that this strategy reveals the poet's view that conventional notions such as normality, love, and family are merely fictions, and that anything that cannot be reduced to an actual act is merely imaginary.

Furthermore, the pervasive imagery of death throughout Kim's poetry has been interpreted as a device for expressing the barrenness of a world without the possibility of salvation and the meaninglessness of life. Kim's poetic speaker is depicted as a lump of flesh dead from birth or as a being that longs for death despite already being dead (Note: e.g., "I was buried outside the grave // the world is my grave goods". Original Korean: “나는 무덤 밖에 묻혔다//세계는 나의 부장품" ("4장 4절" ["Chapter 4 Verse 4"], p. 34); “Is there no one / to drive a stake / through my heart?” Original Korean: “누구/내 가슴에/대못 좀 박아줄 사람/없소?” (“드라큘라” [“Dracula”], p. 36) (both from 트렁크 [Trunk], Munhakdongne, 2020 reissue; first published in 1995).). Critic Kwon Hee-cheol compared this poetic speaker to the "Undead". According to him, the belief that we are already corpses, that death is inevitable, and that any expectation of restoring the world is utterly futile is expressed as the destructive poetic act of devouring the world and reducing it to excrement. In a similar vein, Jang Cheol-hwan compared Kim's poetry to the language of the "Domden" (Note: A term referring to the undertaker (domden) who performs the traditional Tibetan sky burial. They are responsible for dismembering the corpse with knives and axes to make it easier for vultures to consume. Sky burial is respected as a noble ritual that assists in the offering of the body in accordance with Buddhist beliefs in reincarnation.). He explained that, on the premise that life is already permeated with death, the deliberately vicious and obscene profanities in her poetry are the utterances of one who seeks not to be consumed by the pain of life, but to face it with composure.

This view of the world has also been interpreted in connection with the poet's attitude toward poetry. Kwon Hee-cheol viewed poetry writing, for Kim, as an extreme linguistic practice of "accelerating decay" toward the "completion of death". He further interpreted the poet's desire to write "a poem so excellent that it would tear the paper" (Note: In the "Poet's Note" to her fourth poetry collection, Have You Been Feeling Blue These Days?, Kim Eon Hee wrote, "I wanted to write a poem so excellent that it would tear the paper, to write so well as to be unforgivable.") as an attempt to overcome the limitations of poetic practice, (Note: Since poetry is written on paper, Kwon Hee-cheol explained, "Even when poetry writes about 'sin', the terrible destructive power of that sin ends up safely covered behind the paper. The sin described by the poem is not actually committed against us. The word 'sin' may cover over 'sin itself' and render it tame." In other words, Kwon argued that overcoming the limitations of the signifier symbolized by 'paper' requires exposing the world as it truly is with even greater intensity—"opening the door once again" and "making something overflow"—and that this is what the poet's desire to tear the paper signifies.) given that poetry itself is constrained by its nature as a linguistic symbol. Jang Cheol-hwan argued that one who has recognized the meaninglessness of life returns to the world of signifiers to write poetry because poetry itself is the deconstructor (Domden) that completes true death. The poet herself has also described a poet as "a being who feeds on death" and poets as "beings like vultures at a sky burial ground".

=== Rhythm and humor ===
Kim Eon Hee's poetry is characterized by its use of black humor, conveying grotesque poetic situations through restrained forms and rhythmic language. The poet often creates rhythmic effects by adapting folk songs (Note: e.g., "육자배기로" ["As a Yukjabaegi"], 트렁크 [Trunk] (Munhakdongne, 2020 reissue; first published in 1995), p. 40.) and children's songs (Note: e.g., “스너프, 스너프, 스너프” ["Snuff, Snuff, Snuff"], 요즘 우울하십니까? [Have You Been Feeling Blue These Days?] (Munhakdongne, 2011), p. 78.), or through the repetition of phonemes and sentences.

Critic Nam Jin-woo characterized this formal feature as "repetition and cutting". In his analysis, the repetition of sounds through similar-sounding words and homonyms, along with the repetition of the same sentence in modified forms and in series, (Note: e.g., "Shitting while flying, flying while shitting, oh, [...] idly flying idly, shitting". Original Korean: "날면서도 누고 새는, 누면서도 날고, 오오, [...] 실실 날면서 실실, 깔기고" ("새는," ["Birds,"], 요즘 우울하십니까? [Have You Been Feeling Blue These Days?], Munhakdongne, 2011, p. 24); "becoming a sitting machine / becoming a shitting machine, becoming a hard-to-believe / impossible-to-believe machine, [...]". Original Korean: "앉아 있는 기계가 되고/똥 만드는 기계가 되고 믿기 어려운/믿을 수 없는 기계가 되고" ("990412", 말라죽은 앵두나무 아래 잠자는 저 여자 [That Woman Sleeping Under the Withered Cherry Tree], Minumsa, 2000, p. 30)) creates a strong sense of playfulness while also revealing the poet's perception that the world is merely a "pile of fragments" in which the same things are endlessly repeated. He further argued that the juxtaposition of fragmented sentences functions as a "semiotic experiment" that visually reveals the impaired state of the self and the world, creating a correspondence between content and form. Critic Kim Nam-ho likewise noted that Kim's poetry presents tragedy and cruelty through clear rhythms and graceful forms, producing a strange and grotesque sensation for the reader. Translator Soje, who has translated many of Kim Eon Hee's poems, remarked on this aspect: "for Kim, madness carries its own rhythm and musicality."

The poet herself refers to her own poetry as "the jukebox of the slaughterhouse" (Note: In her essay on poetics "The Jukebox of the Slaughterhouse" (Siin Sucheop, Winter 2011), the poet explained that everyone has an "inner slaughterhouse" and that her poetry is like a jukebox placed in one corner of it. In keeping with her view that "a poem is completed when it is read by the reader," she stated that what voice one hears from the jukebox ultimately depends on the reader.), emphasizing that it is a text that appeals to sensation rather than cognition. She states that poetry is "a kind of movement, a rhythm that precedes language", and that poetry emerges from the tension between uncontrollable rhythm and language. According to her view that "poetry is completed by the reader", she believes that a poem is fulfilled when the reader enjoys the pace and rhythm of the text rather than attempting to decipher its hidden meanings. The poet has stated, "To read my poetry is to undergo it."

== Critical reception ==
=== Controversy ===
Kim Eon Hee's early poetry, marked by prominent images of mutilated bodies, was regarded as an avant-garde experiment and credited with pioneering the "aesthetics of ugliness", a current in Korean poetry in the late 1990s. At the same time, it drew strong criticism from some literary critics and became a subject of controversy. Following the publication of her first poetry collection, Trunk (1995), and her second, That Woman Sleeping Under the Withered Cherry Tree (2000), her unconventional style drew contrasting interpretations from feminist critics and the broader literary establishment.

Critics who viewed her work negatively took issue with the extreme depictions of the body and sexual motifs in her poetry. Critic Eom Gyeong-hui argued that, by excluding bodily beauty and the spiritual dimensions of human existence and reducing human beings to a mass of desire composed of the mouth, anus, and genitals, Kim had "confined ontological significance to the abject realm." Eom characterized her poetry as part of "yeopgi culture (엽기 문화)". (Note: "Yeopgi culture" (엽기 문화) refers to a cultural phenomenon that became popular in South Korea around the late 1990s and early 2000s, characterized by a fascination with the bizarre, grotesque, and shocking. Eom regarded this phenomenon as a pathology of post-industrial society.) Poet and critic Kim Jeong-ran characterized Kim Eon Hee's method of displaying the body as "sexual assault inflicted upon the female body by a woman", and strongly criticized it as a practice that gratifies male sadistic impulses and derives literary gain from them.

By contrast, critics who defended her work interpreted this unconventionality as a literary device for dismantling established authority and order. Critic Nam Jin-woo countered that the gaze upon female sexuality and the body in Kim Eon Hee's poetry is "not a phallic gaze that serves male visual pleasure, but a Medusan gaze that invites those caught in it into the chaos at the boundaries between life and death and between reality and fantasy". He argued that, through the imagination of abjection, Kim ruptures from within the paternal power that maintains its sacredness through the expulsion of the maternal, thereby broadening the scope of literary feminism. He further argued that Kim Jeong-ran herself was exercising the very power of the literary establishment that she had criticized, using feminism as a tool to criticize another writer. (Note: In an addendum titled "Addendum—On Kim Jeong-ran's Criticism of Kim Eon hee," appended to his essay "Medusa's Poetry—The Poetic World of Kim Eon hee" (2000, Munhakdongne, Issue 25), Nam Jin-woo critiques Kim Jeong-ran's logic and methods of criticism.)

Critic Shin Eun-jo has observed that these two opposing views continue to coexist in criticism and research on Kim's poetry. Critic Lee Yeon-sook argued that Kim's unconventional poetry, and particularly the succession of favorable reviews it received from male critics, was perceived as threatening by elite feminist circles of the time, leading to Kim Eon Hee's exclusion from the genealogy of 1990s women's poetry. Kim Nam-ho pointed to the irony that, although the literary establishment had long sought to keep Kim Eon Hee's work outside the mainstream through arbitrary readings such as the biographical fallacy (Note: A critical fallacy in which a literary work is interpreted by directly equating its meaning with the author’s actual life, family history, or personal experiences.) and feminist misreadings, this very resistance ultimately helped establish her as one of the leading avant-garde poets in Korean poetry. Meanwhile, the poet has distanced herself from debates framed by a fixed feminist lens. Kim has resisted framing her poetry within fixed ideological categories, stating that she wants it to "exist outside all isms and ideologies, all contexts and systems".

=== Broadening interpretations and reception ===
According to Chung SeulA, Kim's poetry received relatively limited critical attention in the 1990s, when criticism of women's poetry tended to emphasize interiority, everyday life, and motherhood. Chung argues that, in the 2000s, growing critical interest in the destabilization of subjectivity and gender categories led to a reassessment of Kim's aesthetic strategies of bodily fragmentation and the transgression of taboos. Chung further notes that subsequent scholarship has tended to examine the achievements, limitations, and gender strategies of Kim's poetry.

Critic Lee Jae-bok identifies Kim Eon Hee, along with Park Sang-soon, Kim So-yeon, Lee Soo-myung, Hahm Gi-seok, and Lee Cheol-seong, as one of the major poets who have carried forward the lineage of Yi Sang's poetry and exemplified postmodernist aesthetics (Note: Lee Jae-bok argues that their poetry addresses such themes as the disappearance of the subject, landscapes prior to language, a realm of the real distinct from reality, and unconscious desire, and that, in moving beyond an ego-centered modernist aesthetic, their works commonly call for new understandings of the subject, language, and desire.) in Korean poetry since the 1990s. He interprets Kim's poetry as expressing, through linguistic fluidity and contradiction, sensuality, sexual and death drives, corporeality, playfulness, deconstructive tendencies, and intertextuality, mechanical desire that operates through self-proliferation as a mode of the unconscious and the signifier. He further argues that the poetic subject's state of disappearance—resulting from its refusal to be incorporated into the Symbolic order—reveals a barren mode of existence in post-industrial society and constitutes the poet's aesthetic response to it.

In her 2016 book The Era of Air Raids, which examines 1990s Korean poetry, Lee Soo-myung discussed major poets of the decade who created new sensibilities following the ideologically heavy 1980s. In doing so, she highlighted Kim Eon Hee’s debut collection, Trunk (1995). According to Lee, modern poetry gradually moved away from traditional idealism that prioritized rationality, shifting its focus toward reality through poetry of the body. Kim Eon Hee stood at the forefront of this transition. Lee argued that Kim's poetry overturned previous idealistic paradigms by featuring an "explicitly exhibited body", thereby marking a pivotal turning point for the emergence of new-century poetry. (Note: Lee Soo-myung noted that “because of Trunk, the 1990s ceased to be merely a negation of the preceding era and became an age that launched the body and desire into the forefront” (pp. 99–100), drawing attention to the emergence of an independent poetic world that did not rely on the character of its time but instead pushed that era forward into the future.)

Critic Shin Hyeong-cheol describes the disruptive impact and avant-garde significance of Kim Eon Hee's poetry within the trajectory of Korean women's poetry in a single sentence: "[It] made most earlier women's poetry seem coy, and much of the women's poetry that followed seem derivative."

Other studies have approached Kim Eon Hee's poetry through theoretical frameworks such as Julia Kristeva's theory of abjection and Gayatri Spivak's concept of subalternity. Baek Ji-yeon, for example, reads Kim's monster-abject imagery—particularly mirroring and bodily fragmentation—as a strategy that critiques patriarchal ideology and destabilizes established gender categories. Jang Seo-ran interprets Kim's conjunction of the grotesque and sexuality in the damaged female body as a mode of subaltern utterance that resists the symbolic order and exposes structures of patriarchy and colonial capitalism.

From a diachronic perspective, LTI Korea's overview describes Kim's early poetry collections as focusing on critiques of patriarchal authority, while her poetry from her third collection, Unexpected Answer (2005), onward expanded to a broader rejection of established orders such as civilization, institutions, and ideology. Poet Lee Hwa-young situates Kim Eon Hee within the anti-patriarchal and resistant tradition of Korean women's poetry that emerged in the late 1970s and 1980s, arguing that Kim radicalized it through taboo-breaking bodily language. Lee also notes that Kim's poetry moves beyond female suffering to address the crisis of modern individuals and questions of identity through the fragmentation and reconstitution of the poetic subject.

Poet Baek Hak-gi argued that, now that there are "readers ready to read Kim Eon Hee", poetic expressions that were once the subject of controversy are being reconsidered as posing the question, "Why must poetry and women be pure, and why must literature not speak of filth?" He further argued that Kim Eon Hee's poetic exploration of the fundamental fissures of human existence resonates with the lives of contemporary readers worn down by platforms, algorithms, labor, and capital, thereby taking on renewed contemporary relevance.

== Artistic influences and collaborations ==
Kim Eon Hee's poetry has been drawn upon as a source of creative motifs in other art forms, including visual art and music. Contemporary artist Mire Lee used a line from one of Kim's poems as the title of her 2022 exhibition Look, I’m a Fountain of Filth Raving Mad with Love at ZOLLAMT MMK in Frankfurt and incorporated excerpts from Kim’s poetry into her artworks by transcribing them in cement on wooden panels. Kim and Lee later collaborated on the publication Look, I’m a Fountain of Filth Raving Mad with Love (2025), which juxtaposes Kim’s poetry with Lee’s artworks inspired by it. In the introduction, editor Nam Subin describes the two artists’ shared exploration of the body’s intense physicality as leading to a confrontation with the abject or even the Real. In August 2026, Triple Canopy, a magazine covering contemporary art and literature, featured five poems by Kim Eon Hee in its 30th issue, Not Nothing, themed around “holes”, (Note: Taking the question “Is a hole something or nothing?” as its starting point, the issue explores holes as sources of pleasure and potential, noting that they “serve as forms for feelings as well as fodder for philosophy and fantasy”. (Triple Canopy. “Not Nothing.” Triple Canopy, no. 30. Accessed October 7, 2026.)) alongside four new artworks created by Mire Lee for the project.

In 2025, German contemporary composer Sebastian Claren (Note: Sebastian Claren is a German contemporary composer and has been a Professor of Composition at Seoul National University since 2021. Influenced by the precision of electronic music and pop sensitivity, his music is performed at major international festivals, often reflecting his deep engagement with traditional Korean music and cross-cultural collaborations. (Website: https://sebastianclaren.com/)) composed a piece titled Trunk for traditional Korean and Japanese instruments, based on Kim Eon Hee's poem "Trunk". The work premiered in Seoul in October 2025 and was performed in Tokyo in April 2026.

Since 2022, artist Cha Yeonså has drawn extensively on Kim Eon Hee’s poetry as a major source of motifs in her performance and visual art works dealing with the body and death. Her works inspired by Kim Eon Hee’s poetry include the performance Mosquitolarvajuice (2022), which originated from Kim’s poem “Some Day, Some Morning” (Note: Included in the poetry collection GG (2020), the poem begins, “To face the morning of some day some year, dead, To face it as a dead woman”. Lines from the poem are quoted directly in the introductory text to the performance.); the solo exhibitions KKOCH-DA-BAL Is Still There (2024) and Feed me stones (2024); and the performance Those Cats! (2025) (Note: In particular, Those Cats! (2025) took its title from Kim's poem of the same name and was performed using a script featuring excerpts from 29 poems by Kim Eon Hee and 9 poems by Sylvia Plath. (The project's handout: https://energywhoisshe.com/Those-Cats.html)). (Note: Each artwork can be found on Cha Yeonså's website (https://energywhoisshe.com/).) The performance Spring Night, which grew out of the imagery of Kim Eon Hee’s poem “Spring Night”, (Note: Published in her poetry collection Horangmalko (2024), it is the story of a dog tied beneath a magnolia tree. To break the generational cycle of being beaten to death, she kills her offspring at birth, wishing for nothing more than to be beaten quickly and fall asleep (die).) premiered at Doosan Art Center in 2025 and was later staged at Hebbel am Ufer in Berlin in 2026.

== Publications ==
Beginning with her debut collection, Trunk (1995), Kim Eon Hee has published seven poetry collections and one co-authored volume. Her poetry collections have been published by major Korean literary publishers, including Minumsa, Munhakdongne, and Moonji. In recent years, her previously out-of-print early collections have been reissued: Trunk (1995) was republished in 2020, followed by her second collection, That Woman Sleeping Under the Withered Cherry Tree (2000), in 2026. Notably, Trunk, reissued after 25 years, was released as the first volume (No. 001) of the Munhakdongne Poésie series, which began by republishing the debut collections of leading Korean poets across several generations. Poet Kim Min-jeong, the series' editor, explained that choosing a female poet for the inaugural volume was intended to draw greater attention to women poets whose work had received insufficient recognition. (Note: Kim Eon Hee noted that this marked the first instance among the various poetry series from domestic publishers where a female poet's work was released as the inaugural volume. (Kim Min-ji (2021, March 4). "My poetry is a crater erupted by repressed women". Gyeongnam Domin Ilbo.)) Kim Eon Hee's latest poetry collection, Horangmalko (2024), was selected for inclusion in the 2025 Literature Sharing Book Distribution Program, hosted by the Ministry of Culture, Sports and Tourism.

Her fourth poetry collection, Have You Been Feeling Blue These Days?, was published in English translation in the United States in 2019. Translations of her poems have also appeared in a number of American literary journals, including Poetry Northwest, Chicago Review, The Offing, and Waxwing.

=== Poetry collections ===
- 트렁크 [Trunk] (in Korean) (Segyesa, 1995) (Munhakdongne, 2020)
- 말라죽은 앵두나무 아래 잠자는 저 여자 [That Woman Sleeping Under the Withered Cherry Tree] (in Korean) (Minumsa Publishing, 2000)
- 뜻밖의 대답 [Unexpected Answer] (in Korean) (Minumsa Publishing, 2005)
- 요즘 우울하십니까? [Have You Been Feeling Blue These Days?] (in Korean) (Munhakdongne, 2011)
- Have You Been Feeling Blue These Days? (Blacksburg, VA: Noemi Press, 2019). ISBN 978-1934819814. 115 pages. Translated by Sung Gi Kim and Kim Eunsong. Originally published as 요즘 우울하십니까? by Munhakdongne in 2011.
- 보고 싶은 오빠 [Oppa, I Miss You] (in Korean) (Changbi Publishers, 2016)
- GG (in Korean) (현대문학 [Hyundae Munhak], 2020)
- 호랑말코 [Horangmalko] (in Korean) (Moonji Publishing, 2024)

=== Other works ===
- 시는 어떻게 오는가 [How Poetry Comes] (in Korean) (Co-authored) (Seeindongnae, 2018)

== List of awards ==
- 2025: 16th Oh Jang-hwan Literary Award (제16회 오장환문학상)
- 2016: Tongyeong City Literary Award — Cheongma Literary Award (통영시문학상 청마문학상)
- 2014: 2nd Poetry & Thought Literary Award (제2회 시와사상문학상)
- 2013: 6th Yi Sang Poetry Award (제6회 이상시문학상)
- 2005: 17th Gyeongnam Literary Award (제17회 경남문학상)
- 2004: 5th Park In-hwan Literary Award, Special Prize (제5회 박인환문학상 특별상)
